Infernal Atrocity is the debut album by brutal death metal band Revulsed.

Rankings
Revulsed was featured on No Clean Singing's list at #17, on Trevor Strnad of The Black Dahlia Murder's at #8 out of 100, and #9 out of 10 on It Djents.

Critical reception
The album received several positive reviews.

Track listing

Personnel
Revulsed Konni Lühring - vocals
 Sheldon D'Costa - guitar, bass, mixing, mastering
 Jayson Sherlock - drums, mixing, mastering, layoutProduction'
 Yowie Smith - songwriting
 Pär Olofsson - artwork
 Jörg Uken - vocal recording

References

2015 debut albums
Revulsed albums